Lampranthus aurantiacus, the trailing iceplant (a name it shares with other members of its family Aizoaceae), is a plant species in the genus Lampranthus native to South Africa and naturalized in gardens all around the world.

The orange color of the petals is due to the presence of the betaxanthin humilixanthin.

Lampranthus aurantiacus is included in the Tasmanian Fire Service's list of low flammability plants, indicating that it is suitable for growing within a building protection zone.

References

External links 

aurantiacus
Plants described in 1938